Ángel Aguiar García (7 November 1926 – 9 April 2008) was a Cuban gymnast. He competed in the 1948 and 1952 Summer Olympics.

References

1926 births
2008 deaths
Gymnasts at the 1948 Summer Olympics
Gymnasts at the 1952 Summer Olympics
Cuban male artistic gymnasts
Olympic gymnasts of Cuba
Sportspeople from Havana
Pan American Games medalists in gymnastics
Pan American Games gold medalists for Cuba
Pan American Games silver medalists for Cuba
Pan American Games bronze medalists for Cuba
Gymnasts at the 1951 Pan American Games
Medalists at the 1951 Pan American Games
21st-century Cuban people
20th-century Cuban people